Yafeu Akiyele Fula (October 9, 1977 – November 10, 1996), better known by his stage name Yaki Kadafi, was an American rapper and a founder and member of the hip hop groups Outlawz and Dramacydal.

Early life and education 
Yafeu Fula was born in the Bronx, New York City, on October 9, 1977, to Sekou Odinga and Yaasmyn Fula. When he was four years old his father Sekou Odinga was arrested and imprisoned; he was raised by his mother and adopted her surname.

Kadafi's parents were both members of the Black Panther Party. Yaasmyn Fula and Tupac Shakur's mother, Afeni Shakur, were close friends, and Kadafi and Tupac were friends until their respective deaths in 1996. Kadafi had two daughters.

Career 
In 1994, Fula reconnected with his childhood friend Mutah "Napoleon" Beale. Fula's mother, Yaasmyn, introduced Napoleon to Tupac Shakur, and all three created Dramacydal. Fula, only 16, took on the stage name "Young Hollywood". The group appeared on Tupac's album Me Against the World.

In 1995, upon Tupac's release from prison, Fula met with him to sign with Death Row. He guest-starred on Tupac's All Eyez on Me and was featured on three songs. Soon, Dramacydal became known as Outlaw Immortals (or just Outlawz), and Fula changed his stage name to "Yaki Kadafi" after Libyan dictator Muammar Gaddafi. The Outlawz recorded frequently with Tupac throughout 1996. Fula also teamed up with fellow Outlawz member Hussein Fatal to record material under the name "Fatal-N-Felony".

On September 13, 1996, Tupac died after being shot multiple times in a drive-by shooting near the Las Vegas Strip on September 7. Kadafi was in the car directly behind Tupac, and claimed to have seen a white Cadillac pull up alongside him and open fire.

Death 
On November 10, 1996, Fula was shot dead in Orange, New Jersey. Police found his body in the hallway of a friend's apartment building upon responding to a report of gunfire. He was 19 years old. Fellow Outlawz rapper Napoleon, whose cousin Rashad "Roddy" Beale had killed Fula, said in a 2017 interview that Beale had called the shooting accidental and turned himself in to police, and served "7 or 8 years" in prison. Fula's mother responded that his death was intentional as Beale had threatened Fula beforehand, and claimed that Beale's family had also threatened witnesses. Fula is buried at Glendale Cemetery, Bloomfield.

Discography

Solo albums 
 Son Rize Vol. 1 (2004)

Collaboration albums 
 Still I Rise with 2Pac + Outlawz (1999)

Guest appearances 
Me Against The World (2Pac album) ("Me Against the World"; "Outlaw")
All Eyez on Me (2Pac album) ("All Bout U"; "When We Ride")
The Don Killuminati: The 7 Day Theory (2Pac album) ("Hail Mary"; "Just Like Daddy")
Gang Related (soundtrack) ("Starin' Through My Rear View"; "Made Niggaz")
R U Still Down? (Remember Me) (2Pac album) ("Enemies With Me"; "When I Get Free II")
Greatest Hits (2Pac album) ("Hail Mary"; "Me Against the World"; "Hit 'Em Up"; "All Bout U")
Suge Knight Represents: Chronic 2000 ("Who Do U Believe In")
Until the End of Time (2Pac album) ("M.O.B."; "Runnin' On E"; "U Don't Have 2 Worry")
Better Dayz (2Pac album) ("Fuck 'Em All"; "Late Night"; "Fame"; "There U Go"; "Who U Believe In"; "They Don't Give a Fuck About Us")
Tupac: Resurrection (2Pac album) ("Secretz of War"; "Starin' Through My Rear View")
Pac's Life (2Pac album) ("Don't Sleep"; "Soon As I Get Home"; "Don't Stop"; "Untouchable")

See also 

 List of murdered hip hop musicians

References

External links 
Spirit of an Outlaw
Yaki Kadafi's biography
Outlawz biography
Yaki Kadafi discography at Discogs
Yafeu Fula IMDb biography
Son Rize Vol.1 on Discogs
 

African-American rappers
Rappers from New Jersey
1977 births
1996 deaths
1996 murders in the United States
Murdered African-American people
American murder victims
Outlawz members
People murdered in New Jersey
Deaths by firearm in New Jersey
Gangsta rappers
20th-century American rappers
20th-century African-American musicians